Vermiophis is a genus of wormlion in the family Vermileonidae.

Species
Vermiophis ganguanensis Yang, 1979
Vermiophis ganquanensis Yang, 1979
Vermiophis minshanensis Yang & Chen, 1993
Vermiophis taihangensis Yang & Chen, 1993
Vermiophis taishanensis Yang & Chen, 1993
Vermiophis tibetensis Yang & Chen, 1987
Vermiophis wudangensis Yang & Chen, 1986
Vermiophis yanshanensis Yang & Chen, 1993

References

Diptera of Asia
Brachycera genera
Vermileonomorpha